Argaeus ("shining, white") can refer to:

People
 Argaeus I of Macedon
 Argaeus II of Macedon

Places
 Mount Erciyes, called "Argaeus" in ancient times
 Mons Argaeus, a massif on the Moon

See also
Argeus (disambiguation)